The 2009 St. Petersburg Open was a tennis tournament played on indoor hard courts. It was the 15th edition of the St. Petersburg Open, and was part of the ATP World Tour 250 Series of the 2009 ATP World Tour. It was held at the Petersburg Sports and Concert Complex in Saint Petersburg, Russia, from October 25 through November 1, 2009.

ATP entrants

Seeds

 Seeds are based on the rankings of October 19, 2009

Other entrants
The following players received wildcards into the singles main draw:
  Stanislav Vovk
  Andrey Kuznetsov 
  Michail Elgin 

The following players received into the singles main draw as special exempt:
  Mikhail Kukushkin
  Illya Marchenko

The following players received entry from the qualifying draw:
  Oleksandr Dolgopolov Jr.
  Petru-Alexandru Luncanu
  Yuri Schukin
  Sergiy Stakhovsky

Finals

Singles

 Sergiy Stakhovsky defeated  Horacio Zeballos 2–6, 7–6(10–8), 7–6(9–7)
Stakhovsky wins his first title of the year and second of his career.

Doubles

 Colin Fleming /  Ken Skupski defeated  Jérémy Chardy /  Richard Gasquet, 2–6, 7–5, [10–4]

External links
Official website

2009
2009 ATP World Tour
2009 in Russian tennis
October 2009 sports events in Russia
November 2009 sports events in Russia